The 2018 Coupe du Mali is the 57th edition of the Coupe du Mali, the knockout football competition of Mali.

Round of 32
AS Salmamy     0-2 1-5 Stade Malien       

Renaissance G. 0-2 1-2 CASS (Mopti)       

CO Bamako     14-0 6-0 Tériya de San

Djoliba        6-0 1-0 Renaissance H. 

C. Salif Kéïta 4-1 0-2 AS Douanes de Sikasso

FC Naman       2-2 1-7 Elwidji

AS Alençon    1-1 0-1 FC Flambeau        

AFE            4-0 5-0 Bronconi AC        

AS Réal        1-0 0-0 US Bougouni

ASO Messira   10-0 2-0 AS Zégué

FC Balanzan    2-0 2-1 FC Simbo

CMB            1-0 0-0 Tombouctou FC

Académie Kayes 0-3 0-2 CS Duguwolofila    

USC Kita       2-0 unk AS Performance     [USC Kita qualified]

Sonni          2-3 unk US Sévaré          [US Sévaré qualified]

Bakaridjan     2-2 unk AS Yiriba          [AS Yiriba qualified]

Round of 16
[Aug 14]

Djoliba            6-0 FC Balanzan de Ségou

[Aug 15]

CASS (Mopti)       0-2 AFE                

US Sévaré          1-5 CO Bamako          

Stade Malien       4-0 AS Elwidji de Kidal

ASO Messira        4-0 Centre Maliano-Belge

CS Duguwolofila    1-1 AS Réal [5-4 pen]

AS Yiriba          1-2 Centre Salif Kéïta 

USC Kita           2-0 FC Flambeau

Quarterfinals
[Aug 25]

CO Bamako          2-1 Centre Salif Kéïta 

AFE                1-0 CS Duguwolofila    

[Aug 26]

ASO Messira        0-3 Stade Malien       

[Sep 2]

Djoliba            5-0 USC Kita

Semifinals
[Sep 15]

CO Bamako          1-1 Stade Malien       [aet, 9-10 pen]

[Sep 16]

AFE                0-1 Djoliba

Final
[Sep 23]

Stade Malien       2-1 Djoliba            

As the league was not played in 2018, the cup winners qualify for the 2018–19 CAF Champions League and the cup runners-up qualify for the 2018–19 CAF Confederation Cup.

References

Mali
Cup
Football competitions in Mali